Pryssgården is a borough in Norrköping, Sweden.

Norrköping